The 32nd parallel north is a circle of latitude that is 32 degrees north of the Earth's equatorial plane. It crosses Africa, Asia, the Pacific Ocean, North America and the Atlantic Ocean.

In the United States, the parallel defines part of the border between New Mexico and Texas. It was the proposed route of the Texas Pacific Railroad.

From 27 August 1992 to 4 September 1996, the parallel defined the limit of the southern no-fly zone in Iraq as part of Operation Southern Watch. This limit was then moved to the 33rd parallel north.

At this latitude the sun is visible for 14 hours, 15 minutes during the summer solstice and 10 hours, 3 minutes during the winter solstice.

Around the world
Starting at the Prime Meridian and heading eastwards, the parallel 32° north passes through:

{| class="wikitable plainrowheaders"
! scope="col" width="125" | Co-ordinates
! scope="col" | Country, territory or sea
! scope="col" | Notes
|-
| 
! scope="row" | 
| Passing just north of Ouargla
|-
| 
! scope="row" | 
|
|-
| 
! scope="row" | 
|
|-
| style="background:#b0e0e6;" | 
! scope="row" style="background:#b0e0e6;" | Mediterranean Sea
| style="background:#b0e0e6;" | Gulf of Sirte
|-
| 
! scope="row" | 
|
|-
| style="background:#b0e0e6;" | 
! scope="row" style="background:#b0e0e6;" | Mediterranean Sea
| style="background:#b0e0e6;" |
|-
| 
! scope="row" | 
| Passing through Tel Aviv's Ben Gurion Airport
|-
| 
! scope="row" | West Bank
|-
| 
! scope="row" | 
| Passing through Khilda, northwestern Amman
|-
| 
! scope="row" | 
|
|-
| 
! scope="row" | 
| Passing through Al Diwaniyah
|-
| 
! scope="row" | 
|
|-
| 
! scope="row" | 
|
|-valign="top"
| 
! scope="row" | 
|Balochistan - for about 16 km Khyber Pakhtunkhwa Punjab
|-valign="top"
| 
! scope="row" | 
| Punjab Himachal Pradesh
|-valign="top"
| 
! scope="row" | 
| Tibet Qinghai Tibet (for about 12 km) Qinghai (for about 6 km) Tibet (for about 4 km) Qinghai (for about 4 km) Tibet Sichuan Chongqing Shaanxi Hubei Henan Anhui Jiangsu — passing just south of Nanjing
|-
| style="background:#b0e0e6;" | 
! scope="row" style="background:#b0e0e6;" | East China Sea
| style="background:#b0e0e6;" |
|-valign="top"
| 
! scope="row" | 
| Island of Kyūshū:— Kagoshima Prefecture— Miyazaki Prefecture
|-
| style="background:#b0e0e6;" | 
! scope="row" style="background:#b0e0e6;" | Pacific Ocean
| style="background:#b0e0e6;" |
|-valign="top"
| 
! scope="row" | 
| Baja California - passing 10 km north of Ensenada Sonora
|-valign="top"
| 
! scope="row" | 
| Arizona New Mexico New Mexico / Texas border Texas — passing through the cities of Midland and Hillsboro Louisiana Mississippi Alabama Georgia — passing through the city of Savannah
|-valign="top"
| style="background:#b0e0e6;" | 
! scope="row" style="background:#b0e0e6;" | Atlantic Ocean
| style="background:#b0e0e6;" | Passing just south of  Passing just south of the Desertas Islands, Madeira, 
|-
| 
! scope="row" | 
|
|-
| 
! scope="row" | 
| 
|}

See also
31st parallel north
33rd parallel north
Country Club Dispute

References

n32
Borders of New Mexico
Borders of Texas